The Tang-Tibetan Treaty Inscription is a stone pillar standing outside the Jokhang Temple in Lhasa, Tibet Autonomous Region, China. The inscription is written in both Tibetan and Classical Chinese, concerning the treaty between the Tibetan Empire and Tang Empire in A.D. 821/823. Amy Heller's book Tibetan Art describes it as one of the most important treaties between the Tang and Tibet.

References

Reading 

 Old Book of Tang

Tang–Tibet relations
Buildings and structures in Lhasa
Treaties of Tibet
Multilingual texts
History of Lhasa